Chandra is a 2013 Indian romantic drama film, simultaneously made in Kannada and Tamil languages. Directed by Roopa Iyer, it stars Shriya Saran and Prem Kumar. The film deals with the life of a last generation princess and her love story. The film was released on 27 June 2013 to positive reviews and emerged as a high success at the Kannada Box office. The Tamil version of the film was released on 14 February 2014.

Plot
The story revolves around rajkumari Ammani
Chandravathi (Shriya Saran), a princess, and Chandrahasa (Prem Kumar) a music teacher. The two falls in love with each other. But the princess is engaged to Arya (Ganesh Venkatraman), settled in the US, against her wishes. She is not at all impressed by the US culture and tries to contact Chandrahasa to express her feelings. In another development, Chandrahasa promises his father that he would forget Chandravathi and allow her to marry Arya. But on the wedding day, the story takes a dramatic turn which ends on a happy note.

Cast
 Shriya Saran as Maharani Ammanmani Chandravathy
 Prem Kumar as Chandrahasa
 Ganesh Venkatraman as Arya
 Srinath as Maharaja
 Vijayakumar as Guruji Parameshwara
 Vivek as Yuvaraj Sukumar
 Girish Karnad 
 Sukanya as Queen Sarala Devi
 Sumithra as Lalitha
 Sadhu Kokila as Andy Roberts
 Cell Murugan as Lakajarao /  Kilaku 
 Suchendra Prasad
 Yash as the dancer in the song "Tasse Otthu"/"Raaja Raajan"

Production

Development
Roopa Iyer has studied the life of quite a few royal families in India to arrive at a subject for her film. The last branches of Royal Families are not in a position to adjust to normal social life. They do not get the right match to lead a royal life that is a gift for them from ancestors. On this basis Roopa Iyer has added the eternal 'Love' and made a meaningful and beautiful love story subject. The royal families taken over by the government facing a perturbed situation is shown in this movie.

Casting
Roopa Iyer had initially considered Ramya for the lead role and even signed her for the lead role. However the actress was dropped from the film later as she was not in good terms with the director and the fact that she skipped Kalaripayattu class required for her role to perform stunts. Following that, various actresses such as Dia Mirza, Amala Paul, Amrita Rao and Aindrita Ray was considered for the role. Then she finalized Shriya Saran as the leading lady. Saran who earlier made her debut in Kannada cinema through Arasu opposite Puneeth Rajkumar in a cameo role immediately accepted the offer after reading the script. Furthermore, actress Ramya Krishnan and singer S. P. Balasubrahmanyam were chosen for a cameo appearance. Prem Kumar played the protagonist in the film. P. H. K. Doss took the spot behind the camera. Yesteryear actors Girish Karnad, Srinath and Sumithra was signed to appear in supporting roles. Ganesh Venkatraman has also been roped in to play the protagonist in this film. Tamil actor Vivek made his Kannada debut.

Filming
Twenty percent of the shooting was held in USA and rest in India. It was 50 plus days schedule Roopa Iyer had planned for her second direction movie. In Mysore, Bangalore, Rajasthan and Kodagu, Roopa Iyer had chalked out shooting schedules with Mumbai-based Media Networks G.

Soundtrack

Kannada

Tamil

Reception

Critical response 

A critic from The Times of India scored the film at 3.5 out of 5 stars and says "Shriya Saran for her excellent portrayal of the princess. She impresses with her expression and dialogue delivery. Prem is superb as a music teacher and has given life to his character. Srinath shines as Shriya’s father. Music by Gowtham Srivathsa is impressive. PKH Das has done an excellent work with his camera". A Sharadhaa from The New Indian Express wrote "Music by debutant Gautam Srivatsa adds a classic touch. Cameraman PHK Doss has managed to capture the beauty of Shriya well. The verdict: Shot in a light-hearted manner, with a bright palette of colours, and aided by good performances by the actors, the movie is appealing". B S Srivani from Deccan Herald wrote "Prem and Shriya tease and delight the audience with their expressions and body language. Gautam Srivatsa’s music with evocative lyrics heighten the sense of yearning. All in all, Chandra mesmerises like a full moon but the pleasure wanes in the company of avoidable mistakes". A critic from Bangalore Mirror wrote  "The comedy track with two of the best comedians from Kannada and Tamil, Sahdu Kokila and Vivek, falls flat. The slow pace does not help either. The two stars are cinematographer PHK Doss and composer Gautam Srivatsa".

References

External links
 

2013 films
2010s Kannada-language films
Indian romantic drama films
2010s Tamil-language films
Indian multilingual films
2013 multilingual films
Films about royalty
Indian romantic fantasy films
2010s romantic fantasy films